The 2021 RS:X World Championships were held in Cádiz, Spain, from 23 to 27 April 2021.

Medal summary

References

Windsurfing World Championships
RS:X World Championships
RS:X World Championships
International sports competitions hosted by Spain
Sport in Cádiz
RS:X World Championships